Valentino's is a regional Italian restaurant chain based in Lincoln, Nebraska.  Valentino's was founded by Val and Zena Weiler in 1957.  The restaurant was purchased by two Lincoln families in 1971 and began franchising additional locations.  The first carry-out store opened in 1990, and many of the full-scale restaurants converted to the buffet concept in the early-2000s.

As of 2020,  Valentino's has 34 locations in Nebraska.

Subsidiaries 

Opened a pizza by the slice business in 1982 and expanded that to 45 units before selling it in 1985.

References

External links 
 

Companies based in Lincoln, Nebraska
Italian-American culture in Nebraska
Restaurants in Nebraska
Economy of the Midwestern United States
Regional restaurant chains in the United States
Restaurants established in 1957
Buffet restaurants
1957 establishments in Nebraska